Acanthodelphax denticauda is a species of planthoppers belonging to the tribe Delphacini.

It is native to Europe.

References

Delphacidae